Rauhe Ebrach is a river of Bavaria, Germany. It flows into the Regnitz near Pettstadt.

See also
List of rivers of Bavaria

References

Rivers of Bavaria
Bamberg (district)
Haßberge (district)
Schweinfurt (district)
Rivers of Germany